Gymnosiphon cymosus is a flowering plant in the family Burmanniaceae. It is found in Brazil, Colombia, Peru, Suriname, and Venezuela. They grow in lowland tropical rainforest, remaining subterranean until when conditions are favorable, coming up to flower and fruit.

References

Burmanniaceae
Taxa named by George Bentham